Two Japanese destroyers have been named Hatsushimo:

 , a  launched in 1905 and stricken in 1928
 , a  launched in 1933 and sunk in 1945

Imperial Japanese Navy ship names
Japanese Navy ship names